Soden may refer to:

Place names 

Bad Soden, town and spa in the Main-Taunus-Kreis, Hessen, Germany
Bad Soden-Salmünster, town in the Main-Kinzig district, in Hesse, Germany
Bad Sooden-Allendorf, town in the Werra-Meißner-Kreis in Hesse, Germany

People 
Arthur Soden (1843–1925), American executive in Major League Baseball 
Frank Ormond Soden (1895–1961), British First World War flying ace
Frederick Soden (1846–1877), English cricketer
Gordon Ross-Soden (1888 –1931), Australian rules footballer 
Harry Ross-Soden (1886–1944), Australian rower 
Hermann von Soden (1852–1914), German Biblical scholar, minister, professor of divinity, and textual theorist
Julius von Soden (1846–1921), German colonial administrator and politician
Mark Soden (born 1968), Australian former rugby league footballer
Maura Soden (born 1955), American actress and producer
Ray Soden (1925–2012, American politician
Robert Soden (born 1955), English artist and painter
William Soden Hastings (1798–1842), United States Representative from Massachusetts
Wolfram von Soden (1908–1996), German Assyriologist